John Frelinghuysen (1727 – September 5, 1754) also known as Johannes Frelinghuysen was a minister in colonial New Jersey whose work in education laid the groundwork for the establishment Rutgers University (as Queen's College in 1766) and the New Brunswick Theological Seminary (in 1784).

Biography
John Frelinghuysen was the second son of Theodorus Jacobus Frelinghuysen (1691–1749), a German who had lived for a short time in Holland before emigrating in 1720.  John married Dinah Van Bergh (1725–1807), and they had two children:  Eva Frelinghuysen (1751 – c. 1826), Frederick Frelinghuysen (1753–1804), who became a major general in the American Revolution.

John preached in the revivalistic style of Calvinism that his father was known for as part of the First Great Awakening. He continued to serve the parishes in New Jersey that his father had served at Raritan, Millstone, and North Branch. John lived in the Old Dutch Parsonage in Somerville  where he served the three local congregations until his death.  He took in students and a room in the house served as a Dutch Reformed religious seminary.  This center of education was a forerunner of the New Brunswick Theological Seminary and Queen's College, which later developed into Rutgers University. John died on September 5, 1754 and was buried at the Old Somerville Cemetery.

Children
John married Dinah VanBerg and had the following children: 
 Eva Frelinghuysen (1751 – c. 1826), who married Casparus Van Nostrand
 Frederick Frelinghuysen (1753–1804), major general who was buried in Weston, New Jersey.

References

External links
 
 

1727 births
1754 deaths
18th-century Calvinist and Reformed ministers
John
People from Somerville, New Jersey
American people of Dutch descent
Reformed Church in America ministers
People of colonial New Jersey
American people of German descent
18th-century American clergy